Martin H. Weight (April 7, 1855 - July 21, 1920) was the first Mayor of Pasadena, California elected by popular vote.  During his administration, Pasadena's first two parks were established as well as the completion of Pasadena's first City Hall building. Weight ran for re-election in 1903, but lost to William Vedder.

Weight settled in Pasadena in 1875. He served as chair of the Los Angeles County citrus exhibit at the 1893 World's Columbian Exposition in Chicago, Illinois. Weight was the leader of the Pasadena branch of the Benevolent and Protective Order of Elks.

References

People from the San Gabriel Valley
Mayors of Pasadena, California
1855 births
1920 deaths
California Republicans